The 2007 Golden Spin of Zagreb was the 40th edition of an annual senior-level international figure skating competition held in Zagreb, Croatia. It was held at the Dom Sportova between November 8 and 11, 2007. Figure skaters competed in the disciplines of men's singles, ladies' singles, and ice dancing. The Junior-level equivalent was the 2007 Golden Bear of Zagreb. The compulsory dance was the Argentine Tango.

Results

Men

Ladies

Ice dancing

External links
 2007 Golden Spin of Zagreb results

Golden Spin Of Zagreb, 2007
Golden Spin of Zagreb
2000s in Zagreb
Golden Spin